Sulfurylase may refer to:
 Galactose-6-sulfurylase
 an alternate name for the sulfate adenylyltransferase